The 1992–93 season was Manchester City's fourth consecutive season in the top tier of English football, and their first season in the inaugural year of the breakaway Premier League.

Season summary
In the 1992–93 season, Manchester City had a satisfying campaign, reaching the quarter finals of the FA Cup eventually losing 4–2 to Tottenham Hotspur. In the Premier League, they were in a great position by 21 November, just three points adrift from the possible UEFA Cup place and seemed to be their realistic target but during most of the second half of the season, particularly in the final weeks of the campaign, Manchester City went on a poor run of just 2 wins of their final 11 league games and ended up finishing in a disappointing 9th place.

Kit
City retained the previous season's kit, manufactured by English company Umbro and sponsored by Japanese electronics manufacturer Brother.

Final league table

Results summary

Results
Manchester City's score comes first

Legend

FA Premier League

FA Cup

League Cup

First-team squad

Reserve squad

Statistics

Starting 11
Only considering Premier League starts
 GK:  Tony Coton, 40
 RB:  Andy Hill, 23
 CB:  Keith Curle, 39
 CB:  Michel Vonk, 26
 LB:  Terry Phelan, 37
 RM:  David White, 42
 CM:  Garry Flitcroft, 28
 CM:  Fitzroy Simpson, 27
 LM:  Rick Holden, 40
 CF:  Mike Sheron, 33
 CF:  Niall Quinn, 39

References

Manchester City